After the Wedding is a 2019 American drama film written and directed by Bart Freundlich. It is a remake of the Danish-Swedish 2006 film of the same name by Susanne Bier. It stars Julianne Moore, Michelle Williams, Billy Crudup, and Abby Quinn.

The film had its world premiere at the 2019 Sundance Film Festival, and was released in the United States on August 9, 2019, by Sony Pictures Classics.

Plot
Isabel Andersen, co-founder of an orphanage in India, must travel to New York to meet a potential benefactor, millionaire CEO Theresa Young. Isabel is unwilling to travel due to her responsibilities at the orphanage and because she does not want to leave Jai, a boy whom she found on the street when he was a year old. He is the closest child in the orphanage to Isabel, and doesn't want Isabel to leave, but Theresa insists on an in-person meeting. Reluctantly, Isabel agrees and goes to the meeting, which takes place the day before the wedding of Theresa's daughter Grace. Theresa invites Isabel to the wedding as a courtesy and Isabel feels obliged to attend.

At the wedding, Isabel is surprised to see Theresa's husband is her teenage sweetheart Oscar Carlson, now a renowned visual artist. During Grace's wedding toast, she discovers that Grace is not Theresa's biological daughter, but is Oscar's. Isabel soon realizes that Grace is in fact her birth daughter by Oscar, whom they had placed for adoption as teenagers. Isabel returns to the house the day after the wedding to confront Oscar and learns that after placing the baby for adoption, he changed his mind within the 30-day grace period and reclaimed the infant Grace without informing her. Isabel then forces Oscar and Theresa to also inform Grace, who had always been told her biological mother had died.

Theresa encourages Isabel to get to know Grace and reconnect with Oscar, and eventually decides to dramatically increase her donation to the orphanage, thereby forcing Isabel to extend her stay in New York. Eventually, Theresa makes her donation, as well as a newly established fund in Isabel and Grace's name, contingent on Isabel moving to New York permanently.

Mistrustful of Theresa's real motives, Isabel angrily confronts her and learns that Theresa is dying. Theresa admits she has known about Isabel's link to Oscar and Grace all along and arranged the whole charade to install Isabel as a new mother figure to both Grace and Theresa's own eight-year-old twin boys. Oscar discovers his wife's illness around the same time and eventually tells Grace, who is already struggling with doubts about her recent marriage and the news that Isabel is her biological mother.

Theresa dies soon after and the family scatter her ashes. Isabel then returns to India for a visit to the orphanage and Jai. The film ends with Jai and his friends playing football in the orphanage.

Cast
Julianne Moore as Theresa Young, a millionaire CEO and philanthropist. Married to Oscar and mother to Grace and two twin boys. She is a benefactor who knows about Isabel and is dying and wants to donate money to the orphanage.
Michelle Williams as Isabel Andersen, founder of a charitable organization that runs an orphanage in Tamil Nadu. She is the biological mother of Grace.
Billy Crudup as Oscar Carlson, a successful visual artist who is married to Theresa. Father to Grace and two twin boys.
Abby Quinn as Grace Carlson, Theresa and Oscar's daughter who is about to get married.
Alex Esola as Jonathan, Grace's fiancé who works for Theresa's company.
Vir Pachisia as Jai, a young boy at the orphanage in India. He is very close to Isabel.
Anjula Bedi as Preena, who helps Isabel run the orphanage.
Will Chase as Frank, wedding guest who hits on Isabel, prompting her anger.

Production
In February 2018, Julianne Moore was set to star in an American remake of the Danish film by Susanne Bier, and will see the leading roles changed from male to female. Diane Kruger was also cast. However, in April 2018, Michelle Williams replaced Kruger. In May 2018, Billy Crudup and Abby Quinn joined the cast.

Principal production began in May 2018.

Release
The film had its world premiere at the Sundance Film Festival on January 24, 2019. Shortly after, Sony Pictures Classics acquired U.S. distribution rights to the film, and set it for an August 9, 2019, release.

Reception
The site's critical consensus reads: "After the Wedding benefits from solid casting and strong source material, yet proves stubbornly resistant to spark to emotional life." On Metacritic the film has a weighted average score of 52 out of 100, based on reviews from 30 critics, indicating "mixed or average reviews".

Variety's Peter Debruge wrote: "This sensitive remake of Susanne Bier's overcooked Danish Oscar nominee has shrewdly been flipped from a male-driven meller to an emotional showcase for Michelle Williams and Julianne Moore." Debruge praises the film for its subtlety, as it "strips away anything excessive, allowing subtext to surface in the quiet spaces between dialogue."
David Rooney of The Hollywood Reporter wrote: "Bart Freundlich's American remake of the Bier film flips the gender of the main characters, yielding predictably strong performances from Julianne Moore and Michelle Williams but otherwise removing the teeth from a melodrama that grows increasingly preposterous as it crawls toward its weepy conclusion."
Richard Roeper of the Chicago Sun-Times gave the film 2 out of 4, and wrote: "It's a morose and slow-paced and off-putting drama, in which even the joyous moments seem brittle and draped in melancholy."
David Fear of Rolling Stone gave the film a mixed review but praised Williams: "This is Williams' spotlight, and it's worth slogging through some of the soapier-to-sludgier aspects to watch her ply her craft."

References

External links 
 
 
 

2019 films
2019 drama films
2010s English-language films
American drama films
American remakes of Danish films
American remakes of Swedish films
Drama film remakes
Films about families
Films about weddings in the United States
Films directed by Bart Freundlich
Films scored by Mychael Danna
Films set in Kolkata
Films set in New York City
Films shot in Mumbai
Films shot in New York City
Sony Pictures Classics films
2019 independent films
2010s American films